The 1972–73 New York Rangers season was the franchise's 47th season.

Regular season

Final standings

Schedule and results

|- align="center" bgcolor="#FFBBBB"
| 1 || 7 || @ Detroit Red Wings || 5–3 || 0–1–0
|- align="center" bgcolor="#FFBBBB"
| 2 || 8 || @ Chicago Black Hawks || 5–1 || 0–2–0
|- align="center" bgcolor="#CCFFCC"
| 3 || 11 || Vancouver Canucks || 5–3 || 1–2–0
|- align="center" bgcolor="#FFBBBB"
| 4 || 14 || @ Montreal Canadiens || 6–1 || 1–3–0
|- align="center" bgcolor="#CCFFCC"
| 5 || 15 || Minnesota North Stars || 6–2 || 2–3–0
|- align="center" bgcolor="#CCFFCC"
| 6 || 18 || Boston Bruins || 7–1 || 3–3–0
|- align="center" bgcolor="#CCFFCC"
| 7 || 21 || @ New York Islanders || 2–1 || 4–3–0
|- align="center" bgcolor="white"
| 8 || 22 || Montreal Canadiens || 1–1 || 4–3–1
|- align="center" bgcolor="#CCFFCC"
| 9 || 25 || Philadelphia Flyers || 6–1 || 5–3–1
|- align="center" bgcolor="#CCFFCC"
| 10 || 29 || Chicago Black Hawks || 7–1 || 6–3–1
|-

|- align="center" bgcolor="#CCFFCC"
| 11 || 1 || @ Chicago Black Hawks || 3–2 || 7–3–1
|- align="center" bgcolor="#FFBBBB"
| 12 || 4 || @ Pittsburgh Penguins || 6–4 || 7–4–1
|- align="center" bgcolor="#CCFFCC"
| 13 || 5 || @ Philadelphia Flyers || 3–2 || 8–4–1
|- align="center" bgcolor="#CCFFCC"
| 14 || 8 || Vancouver Canucks || 5–2 || 9–4–1
|- align="center" bgcolor="#CCFFCC"
| 15 || 11 || California Golden Seals || 7–2 || 10–4–1
|- align="center" bgcolor="#CCFFCC"
| 16 || 12 || Los Angeles Kings || 5–1 || 11–4–1
|- align="center" bgcolor="#CCFFCC"
| 17 || 15 || Philadelphia Flyers || 7–3 || 12–4–1
|- align="center" bgcolor="#CCFFCC"
| 18 || 18 || @ St. Louis Blues || 3–1 || 13–4–1
|- align="center" bgcolor="#FFBBBB"
| 19 || 19 || Pittsburgh Penguins || 5–3 || 13–5–1
|- align="center" bgcolor="#CCFFCC"
| 20 || 21 || @ Atlanta Flames || 3–1 || 14–5–1
|- align="center" bgcolor="#FFBBBB"
| 21 || 23 || @ Buffalo Sabres || 5–3 || 14–6–1
|- align="center" bgcolor="#CCFFCC"
| 22 || 26 || Toronto Maple Leafs || 7–4 || 15–6–1
|- align="center" bgcolor="#FFBBBB"
| 23 || 28 || @ Vancouver Canucks || 2–1 || 15–7–1
|- align="center" bgcolor="white"
| 24 || 29 || @ Los Angeles Kings || 2–2 || 15–7–2
|-

|- align="center" bgcolor="white"
| 25 || 1 || @ California Golden Seals || 3–3 || 15–7–3
|- align="center" bgcolor="#CCFFCC"
| 26 || 3 || Atlanta Flames || 3–2 || 16–7–3
|- align="center" bgcolor="#FFBBBB"
| 27 || 6 || Buffalo Sabres || 3–2 || 16–8–3
|- align="center" bgcolor="#CCFFCC"
| 28 || 9 || @ New York Islanders || 4–1 || 17–8–3
|- align="center" bgcolor="#CCFFCC"
| 29 || 10 || New York Islanders || 4–1 || 18–8–3
|- align="center" bgcolor="#CCFFCC"
| 30 || 13 || @ Toronto Maple Leafs || 4–3 || 19–8–3
|- align="center" bgcolor="#FFBBBB"
| 31 || 14 || @ Boston Bruins || 4–2 || 19–9–3
|- align="center" bgcolor="#FFBBBB"
| 32 || 16 || @ Minnesota North Stars || 5–1 || 19–10–3
|- align="center" bgcolor="#CCFFCC"
| 33 || 17 || Pittsburgh Penguins || 9–1 || 20–10–3
|- align="center" bgcolor="#CCFFCC"
| 34 || 20 || @ St. Louis Blues || 5–4 || 21–10–3
|- align="center" bgcolor="#FFBBBB"
| 35 || 21 || Atlanta Flames || 5–2 || 21–11–3
|- align="center" bgcolor="#CCFFCC"
| 36 || 24 || Detroit Red Wings || 5–0 || 22–11–3
|- align="center" bgcolor="#FFBBBB"
| 37 || 27 || Buffalo Sabres || 4–1 || 22–12–3
|- align="center" bgcolor="#CCFFCC"
| 38 || 31 || St. Louis Blues || 6–1 || 23–12–3
|-

|- align="center" bgcolor="#CCFFCC"
| 39 || 3 || Los Angeles Kings || 3–0 || 24–12–3
|- align="center" bgcolor="#FFBBBB"
| 40 || 6 || Buffalo Sabres || 4–1 || 24–13–3
|- align="center" bgcolor="#CCFFCC"
| 41 || 7 || Pittsburgh Penguins || 3–0 || 25–13–3
|- align="center" bgcolor="#CCFFCC"
| 42 || 11 || @ Buffalo Sabres || 4–2 || 26–13–3
|- align="center" bgcolor="#CCFFCC"
| 43 || 13 || @ St. Louis Blues || 5–3 || 27–13–3
|- align="center" bgcolor="#CCFFCC"
| 44 || 14 || @ Philadelphia Flyers || 5–2 || 28–13–3
|- align="center" bgcolor="white"
| 45 || 17 || @ Los Angeles Kings || 4–4 || 28–13–4
|- align="center" bgcolor="#CCFFCC"
| 46 || 19 || @ California Golden Seals || 6–0 || 29–13–4
|- align="center" bgcolor="#CCFFCC"
| 47 || 20 || @ Vancouver Canucks || 4–3 || 30–13–4
|- align="center" bgcolor="#CCFFCC"
| 48 || 24 || Boston Bruins || 4–2 || 31–13–4
|- align="center" bgcolor="#CCFFCC"
| 49 || 27 || @ Detroit Red Wings || 6–3 || 32–13–4
|- align="center" bgcolor="#CCFFCC"
| 50 || 28 || Toronto Maple Leafs || 5–2 || 33–13–4
|- align="center" bgcolor="#CCFFCC"
| 51 || 31 || California Golden Seals || 3–1 || 34–13–4
|-

|- align="center" bgcolor="#CCFFCC"
| 52 || 3 || @ Boston Bruins || 7–3 || 35–13–4
|- align="center" bgcolor="#CCFFCC"
| 53 || 4 || Atlanta Flames || 6–0 || 36–13–4
|- align="center" bgcolor="#CCFFCC"
| 54 || 7 || New York Islanders || 6–0 || 37–13–4
|- align="center" bgcolor="#CCFFCC"
| 55 || 10 || @ New York Islanders || 6–0 || 38–13–4
|- align="center" bgcolor="white"
| 56 || 11 || Montreal Canadiens || 2–2 || 38–13–5
|- align="center" bgcolor="#FFBBBB"
| 57 || 14 || @ Montreal Canadiens || 6–3 || 38–14–5
|- align="center" bgcolor="#FFBBBB"
| 58 || 15 || @ Buffalo Sabres || 4–1 || 38–15–5
|- align="center" bgcolor="#CCFFCC"
| 59 || 18 || New York Islanders || 3–2 || 39–15–5
|- align="center" bgcolor="#CCFFCC"
| 60 || 21 || @ Los Angeles Kings || 4–3 || 40–15–5
|- align="center" bgcolor="#FFBBBB"
| 61 || 23 || @ California Golden Seals || 5–3 || 40–16–5
|- align="center" bgcolor="#CCFFCC"
| 62 || 25 || Minnesota North Stars || 6–5 || 41–16–5
|- align="center" bgcolor="white"
| 63 || 28 || Chicago Black Hawks || 3–3 || 41–16–6
|-

|- align="center" bgcolor="#CCFFCC"
| 64 || 3 || @ Detroit Red Wings || 6–3 || 42–16–6
|- align="center" bgcolor="#FFBBBB"
| 65 || 4 || Vancouver Canucks || 4–3 || 42–17–6
|- align="center" bgcolor="white"
| 66 || 7 || Philadelphia Flyers || 2–2 || 42–17–7
|- align="center" bgcolor="#CCFFCC"
| 67 || 10 || @ Pittsburgh Penguins || 5–4 || 43–17–7
|- align="center" bgcolor="#CCFFCC"
| 68 || 11 || Toronto Maple Leafs || 4–2 || 44–17–7
|- align="center" bgcolor="#FFBBBB"
| 69 || 14 || @ Chicago Black Hawks || 4–2 || 44–18–7
|- align="center" bgcolor="#FFBBBB"
| 70 || 17 || @ Toronto Maple Leafs || 7–5 || 44–19–7
|- align="center" bgcolor="#CCFFCC"
| 71 || 18 || St. Louis Blues || 3–1 || 45–19–7
|- align="center" bgcolor="#CCFFCC"
| 72 || 20 || @ Minnesota North Stars || 6–1 || 46–19–7
|- align="center" bgcolor="#CCFFCC"
| 73 || 22 || @ Atlanta Flames || 4–1 || 47–19–7
|- align="center" bgcolor="#FFBBBB"
| 74 || 24 || @ Boston Bruins || 3–0 || 47–20–7
|- align="center" bgcolor="#FFBBBB"
| 75 || 25 || Minnesota North Stars || 2–1 || 47–21–7
|- align="center" bgcolor="#FFBBBB"
| 76 || 28 || Boston Bruins || 6–3 || 47–22–7
|- align="center" bgcolor="#FFBBBB"
| 77 || 31 || @ Montreal Canadiens || 5–1 || 47–23–7
|-

|- align="center" bgcolor="white"
| 78 || 1 || Detroit Red Wings || 3–3 || 47–23–8
|-

Playoffs

Key:  Win  Loss

Player statistics
Skaters

Goaltenders

†Denotes player spent time with another team before joining Rangers. Stats reflect time with Rangers only.
‡Traded mid-season. Stats reflect time with Rangers only.

Awards and records

Transactions
The Rangers defense lost their gifted-defenseman, Brad Park due to a knee injury that occurred on 11/15/72 against the Flyers, which forced him out of the lineup for the next 18 games. Looking to plug that hole, they searched around the league for another talented-defenseman but prospects were sparse. So, on 11/28/72, they settled on veteran defenseman Ron Harris of the Flames who had minimal offensive skills but played a physical checking game. A 26-year-old forward, by the name of Curt Bennett was still scoreless with the Rangers while mostly sitting on the bench, so he was sent to the Flames in exchange. Both guys ultimately paid dividends for their new teams. Harris was instrumental in winning key games for the Rangers in different ways such as: against the rival-Bruins in game #2 of the 1973 playoffs, he threw a legal, rolling, hip-check at Phil Esposito which injured him, thus, sinking the hopes of the Bruins since they lost that playoff series; plus then, in a key 1974 playoff game against the Canadians, Harris scored the game-winning goal in overtime which eventually sparked the Rangers in winning that playoff series. Likewise, the Flames cashed in on Curt Bennett since he finally and quickly matured with them by becoming an excellent goal-scorer and their toughest fighter.

Draft picks
New York's picks at the 1972 NHL Amateur Draft in Montreal, Quebec, Canada.

Farm teams

See also
 1972–73 NHL season

References

External links
 
 Rangers on Hockey Database

New York Rangers seasons
New York Rangers
New York Rangers
New York Rangers
New York Rangers
Madison Square Garden
1970s in Manhattan